Lithostege marcata is a species of moth in the family Geometridae first described by William Barnes and James Halliday McDunnough in 1916. It is found in North America.

The MONA or Hodges number for Lithostege marcata is 7630.

References

Further reading

 
 

Chesiadini
Articles created by Qbugbot
Moths described in 1916